Renaturation can mean:
 the inverse process of denaturation
 ecological restoration, also sometimes called renaturization
The conversion of denatured protein or nucleic acid to its native configuration is called renaturation